Millisia brevis is a mycolic acid producing bacterium from the family Nocardiaceae which has been isolated from activated sludge in Australia.

References

Further reading

External links 
Type strain of Millisia brevis at BacDive -  the Bacterial Diversity Metadatabase

Mycobacteriales
Bacteria described in 2006